Mettur Dam railway station (Code: MTDM)  is a railway station situated in Mettur, Salem district in the Indian state of Tamil Nadu. The station is end station on the –Mettur Dam line. The station is operated by the Southern Railway zone of the Indian Railways and comes under the Salem railway division.

References

External links

Railway stations in Salem district
Salem railway division
Railway terminus in India